Kaida may refer to:

Kaida (surname), a Japanese surname
Kaida, Nagano, a former village in Kiso District, Nagano Prefecture, Japan
Kaida Station, a railway station in Kunimi, Fukushima Prefecture, Japan
Korea Automobile Importers & Distributors Association, a South Korean trade association